Killer Shark is a 1950 American B film directed by Budd Boetticher and starring Roddy McDowall, Laurette Luez and Roland Winters. Charles Lang scripted the film and also appeared on it.

Plot summary
Shark fishermen on ocean Mexican Cantina with tequila and Mariachi music, has good scene of catching and cleaning shark.

Cast

Production
Budd Boetticher later recalled it "was a small picture with Roddy McDowall as the star, and I just loved him. He always had his mother and father with him on the set, but he was just about to have his 21st birthday. So we went out on location on purpose, so that he could get out from underneath their jurisdiction and see some girls here and there. So we made the picture in Baja, California, and Roddy was no virgin after that."

References

External links

 
 Killer Shark at TCMDB
 
 

1950 films
American adventure films
Films shot in California
Monogram Pictures films
Films directed by Budd Boetticher
1950 adventure films
American black-and-white films
1950s English-language films
1950s American films